Flight 130 may refer to:
 Aviogenex Flight 130, crashed on 23 May 1971
 Scandinavian Airlines System Flight 130, hijacked 15–16 September 1972
 Baikal Airlines Flight 130, crashed on 3 January 1994

0130